The sphygmograph was a mechanical device used to measure blood pressure in the mid-19th century. It was developed in 1854 by German physiologist Karl von Vierordt (1818–1884). It is considered the first external, non-intrusive device used to estimate blood pressure.

The device was a system of levers hooked to a scale-pan in which weights were placed to determine the amount of external pressure needed to stop blood flow in the radial artery. Although the instrument was cumbersome and its measurements imprecise, the basic concept of Vierordt's sphygmograph eventually led to the blood pressure cuff used today.

In 1863, Étienne-Jules Marey (1830–1904) improved the device by making it portable. Also he included a specialized instrument to be placed above the radial artery that was able to magnify pulse waves and record them on paper with an attached pen.

In 1872, Frederick Akbar Mahomed published a description of a modified sphygmograph. This modified version made the sphygmograph quantitative, so that it was able to measure arterial blood pressure.

In 1880, Samuel von Basch (1837–1905) invented the sphygmomanometer, which was then improved by Scipione Riva-Rocci (1863–1937) in the 1890s. In 1901 Harvey Williams Cushing improved it further, and Heinrich von Recklinghausen (1867–1942) used a wider cuff, and so it became the first accurate and practical instrument for measuring blood pressure.

References

External links
 R.E. Dudgeon M.D. The sphygmograph : its history and use as an aid to diagnosis in ordinary practice (1882). The Medical Heritage Library.
 Drawing of Vierordt's Sphygmograph.

Medical equipment
Blood pressure
Physiological instruments